Babcock Lake is a lake in the U.S. state of New York.

Babcock Lake was named after "Honest" John Babcock, the supervisor of Grafton from 1819 to 1823 and 1825 to 1828.

References

Lakes of Rensselaer County, New York
Lakes of New York (state)